Rafael Luis Morales Maldonado is the seventh Bishop of Puerto Rico in The Episcopal Church.

Biography 
He was born in Toa Alta, Puerto Rico into the Roman Catholic Church, then Catholic Deacon Morales was received by Bishop David Andrés Alvarez-Velázquez into the Anglican faith, which would allow him, a married man, to be ordained into the priesthood.

Prior to being consecrated a bishop, Morales' roles included serving as a parish priest in Toa Baja, a suburb of Puerto Rico's capital city of San Juan, and as head of the Episcopal Cathedral School.

He was chosen on December 10, 2016 among four candidates, including a female priest, by the Diocesan Assembly to succeed David Alvarez as the Diocesan Bishop and take over the reins of the church from Bishop Wilfrido Ramos-Orench, who served as provisional diocesan bishop for approximately 3 years after Alvarez' retirement upon reaching the mandatory retirement age of 72.

See also
 List of Episcopal bishops of the United States
 Historical list of the Episcopal bishops of the United States

References

External links
Diocesan Site (in Spanish)

Living people
People from Toa Alta, Puerto Rico
Puerto Rican Episcopalians
Puerto Rican bishops
Year of birth missing (living people)
Converts to Anglicanism from Roman Catholicism
Episcopal bishops of Puerto Rico